Viktor Andreyevich Bortsov (June 14, 1934 in Orenburg, USSR – May 20, 2008 in Moscow, Russia) was a Soviet/Russian theatrical and cinema actor.  He was a People's Artist of RSFSR.

Bortsov was best known as  Savva Ignatyevich  in the 1982 film The Pokrovsky Gate.

He died at 73, after a long struggle with intestinal cancer. A civil funeral was held at the Maly Theatre, Moscow on May 23, 2008. He was buried in Troyekurovskoye Cemetery in Moscow.

Selected filmography 
 1970 —  Liberation  as  General Grigory Oriol 
 1978 —  Aniskin Begins Again as  Sidorov,  tractor driver 
 1982 —  Station for Two (Вокзал для двоих) as  drunkard in a restaurant 
 1982 —  The Pokrovsky Gate (Покровские ворота) as Savva Ignatyevich 
 1984 —  Alone and Unarmed (Один и без оружия) as  Dmitry Sergeyevich 
 1986 —  Ballad of an Old Gun (Баллада о старом оружии) as  Gritsenko 
 1988 —  Gardes-Marines, Ahead! (Гардемарины, вперёд!) as  Gavrila 
 1991 —  Viva Gardes-Marines! (Виват, гардемарины!) as  Gavrila

References

External links
 
 

1934 births
People from  Orenburg
2008 deaths
People's Artists of the RSFSR
Deaths from colorectal cancer
Deaths from cancer in Russia
Burials in Troyekurovskoye Cemetery
Russian male actors
Recipients of the Order of Honour (Russia)
Honored Artists of the RSFSR
Recipients of the Order "For Merit to the Fatherland", 4th class